Laura Kerr (born Laura Hornickel; October 21, 1902 – May 5, 1991) was an American literary agent and screenwriter. She and her second husband, Allen Rivkin, wrote several screenplays together in the 1940s and 1950s.

Biography 
Born to George Hornickel and Cara Kerr in Dillonvale, Ohio, in 1902, Laura was an only child. She attended Vassar College and entered a career as a literary agent. All the while, she wrote original plays.

After her first marriage to writer-producer Anthony Veiller (with whom she had a daughter) came to an end, she began writing screenplays. In 1947, she won both the Photoplay Award and the Look Magazine Award for her work.

She and her second husband, Allen Rivkin, wrote a number of scripts together, as well as a book about the film industry called Hello, Hollywood!

She died on May 1, 1991, in Woodland Hills, California, after suffering a stroke.

Selected filmography 

 Battle Circus (1953)
 Grounds for Marriage (1951)
 My Dream Is Yours (1949)
 The Farmer's Daughter (1947)
 Brazil (1944)

References 

American women screenwriters
Vassar College alumni
1902 births
1991 deaths
20th-century American women writers
20th-century American screenwriters